Balbuena metro station is a station of the Mexico City Metro in Venustiano Carranza, Mexico City. It is an underground station with two side platforms served by Line 1 (the Pink Line) between Moctezuma and Boulevard Puerto Aéreo stations. It serves the colonias (neighborhoods) of Jardín Balbuena and Moctezuma 1ª sección, along Calzada Ignacio Zaragoza. The station's pictogram features the silhouette of four flowers with four petals each, in reference to the Balbuena Garden, found in the neighborhood of the same name, and from which the station takes its name.

Balbuena station opened on 4 September 1969 with service westward toward Chapultepec and eastward toward Zaragoza. In 2019, the station had an average daily ridership of 13,431 passengers, making it the 133rd busiest station in the network and the second least used on the line. The facilities are partially accessible for people with disabilities as there are escalators and access ramps. Since 11 July 2022, the station has remained closed due to modernization works on the tunnel and the line's technical equipment.

Location

Balbuena is a metro station located along Calzada Ignacio Zaragoza, in Venustiano Carranza, Mexico City. The station serves the colonias (Mexican Spanish for "neighborhoods") of Jardín Balbuena and Moctezuma 1ª sección. Within the system, the station lies between Moctezuma and Boulevard Puerto Aéreo. The area is serviced by a Centro de transferencia modal (CETRAM), a type of transport hub.

Exits
There are two exits:
North: Calzada Ignacio Zaragoza and 17 Street, Moctezuma 1ª sección.
South: Calzada Ignacio Zaragoza and De la Portilla Avenue, Jardín Balbuena.

History and construction
Line 1 of the Mexico City Metro was built by Ingeniería de Sistemas de Transportes Metropolitano, Electrometro and Cometro, the latter a subsidiary of Empresas ICA. Its first section opened on 4 September 1969, operating from Chapultepec to Zaragoza stations. Balbuena is an underground station that has a partially disabled-accessible service with escalators and access ramps. The station's pictogram features silhouettes of four flowers with four petals each referencing the neighborhood's garden of the same name. In turn, the garden was named after Bernardo de Balbuena, a Spanish poet whose work includes "La grandeza mexicana" ("The Grandeur of Mexico").

In 2016, the station received renovation works; these included the addition of antibacterial porcelain sheeting and the installation of LED lighting technology, as well as the sealing of leaks and the replacement of electrical panels.

On 20 January 2021, the station was flooded with sewage following a failure in the sump system attributed to power outages caused by the PCCI fire that occurred two weeks earlier. The station will be closed in 2022 for modernization work on the tunnel and the line's technical equipment.

Ridership
According to the data provided by the authorities since the 2000s, commuters have averaged per year between 6,100 and 23,000 daily entrances in the last decade. In 2019, before the impact of the COVID-19 pandemic on public transport, the station's ridership totaled 4,902,639 passengers, which was an increase of 111,634 passengers compared to 2018. In the same year, Balbuena metro station was the 133rd busiest station of the system's 195 stations, and it was the line's second least used.

Notes

References

External links

1969 establishments in Mexico
Accessible Mexico City Metro stations
Mexico City Metro Line 1 stations
Mexico City Metro stations in Venustiano Carranza, Mexico City
Railway stations located underground in Mexico
Railway stations opened in 1969